KYJK (105.9 FM, "105.9 Jack FM") is a commercial radio station licensed to Missoula, Montana, owned by Simmons Media Ventures, LLC, through licensee Missoula Broadcasting Company, LLC. KYJK airs an Adult Hits music format, using the trademarked "Jack FM" handle.

KYJK has filed an application for a U.S. Federal Communications Commission construction permit to increase its ERP to 2,000 watts.

External links
105.9 Jack FM Official Website

FCC application

Adult hits radio stations in the United States
Jack FM stations
YJK
Radio stations established in 2005
Missoula County, Montana